Nupserha testaceipes is a species of beetle in the family Cerambycidae. It was described by Maurice Pic in 1926. It contains the varietas Nupserha testaceipes var. batesi.

References

testaceipes
Beetles described in 1926